The 1955 Washington State Cougars football team was an American football team that represented Washington State College during the 1955 college football season.

The Cougars' sole victory was in the Battle of the Palouse over neighbor  the Vandals had won the previous year in Pullman, which was their first win in the series in 29 years.

Days after the season ended, Kircher was relieved of his duties with a year remaining on his five-year contract, at $12,500 per year. He opted to stay in Pullman and acquired a motel-restaurant, the Hilltop Lodge,  His successor was Jim Sutherland, the Cougars' head coach for eight seasons, through 1963.

Schedule

NFL Draft
Two Cougars were selected in the 1956 NFL Draft, which was thirty rounds (360 selections).

References

External links
 Game program: UCLA at WSC – October 1, 1955
 Game program: Oregon at WSC – November 5, 1955
 Game program: San Jose State at WSC – November 12, 1955

Washington State
Washington State Cougars football seasons
Washington State Cougars football